Elections were held for seats reserved for the party-list representation in the House of Representatives of the Philippines on May 9, 2016. At most 20% of the seats in the House of Representatives of the Philippines are reserved for party-list representatives. The election was via the party-list system, with a 2% "soft" election threshold via the Hare quota, except that no party can win more than 3 seats, and if the seats won do not reach the 20% of the seats of the entire House of Representatives, the parties that have yet to win seats will get a seat each until the 20% reserved for party-lists have been filled up. 

As a result of the creation of new legislative districts during the 16th Congress, the number of party-list seats available for the 2016 elections was increased by one.

Raffle
On December 14, 2015, the commission raffled the parties on the order that they will appear on the ballot, as was done in the 2013 elections. This is to avoid parties using numbers or the letter "A" or the number "1" as the first letter of their party to be seen first by the voter. Only the order in which the parties would be listed was determined; the respective numbers would be determined after petitions for disqualification of certain parties were dealt with.

Nominees

The COMELEC released the list of nominees of every party that appears on the ballot.

Results

Aftermath
The proclamation of the winners for the party-list election was done on May 19, ten days after election day. Several party-list groups noted certain discrepancies which could affect the distribution of the seats for the party-lists. One of them is Gabriela, which stated that the computation for the total number of seats assigned for party-list was erroneous. In the motion they filed before the Supreme Court, they stated that since 20% of the district representative seats (238) is equal to 59.5, the correct seat total should be 60, not 59. This would allow the Gabriela party-list to gain one seat based on the computation done by the COMELEC. 

Another party-list, Ating Guro, noted that there was an error on the computation made by COMELEC in proclaiming the winners of the party-list election. They said that Coop-NATCCO, based on its total number of votes, was entitled to only one seat, but instead COMELEC proclaimed two representatives from the party. Ating Guro claimed that the seat gained by COOP-NATCCO should have been theirs. They filed a petition before the COMELEC on May 23.

References

2016 Philippine general election
Party-list elections in the Philippines